Simon Ohanesovych Haloyan (born 2 July 2002) is a Ukrainian professional footballer who plays as a central midfielder for Ukrainian club Kremin Kremenchuk.

References

External links
 
 

2002 births
Living people
People from Solnechnogorsky District
Ukrainian footballers
Association football midfielders
FC Obolon-Brovar Kyiv players
FC Obolon-2 Kyiv players
FC Kremin Kremenchuk players
Ukrainian First League players
Ukrainian Second League players